Vranjska is a Serbo-Croatian toponym, derived from vran, an archaic word for "dark, black". It may refer to:

Vranjska, Bosanska Krupa, village in northwestern Bosnia and Herzegovina
Vranjska (Bileća), village in southeastern Bosnia and Herzegovina
Vranjska Banja, spa town in southern Serbia
Gornja Vranjska, town in western Serbia
Mala Vranjska, village in western Serbia
FK Železničar Vranjska Banja, football team

See also
Vranje
Vranjak (disambiguation)

Serbo-Croatian place names